Lucien Grenier (October 11, 1925 – August 3, 1998) was a lawyer and political figure in Quebec, Canada. He represented Bonaventure in the House of Commons of Canada from 1958 to 1962 as a Progressive Conservative.

He was born in Saint-Godefroi, Quebec, the son of Simon Grenier and Marie-G. Hirard, and was educated at the Séminaire de Gaspé. Grenier practised law at New Carlisle, Quebec. He was an unsuccessful candidate for a seat in the Quebec assembly in 1948. In 1949, he married Pierrette Demers. Grenier was defeated when he ran for reelection to the House of Commons in 1962 and 1963.

References

Members of the House of Commons of Canada from Quebec
Progressive Conservative Party of Canada MPs
1925 births
1998 deaths